Trechus hauseri is a species of ground beetle in the subfamily Trechinae. It was described by Jeannel in 1962.

References

hauseri
Beetles described in 1962